On 26 June 2022, Zara Aleena was sexually assaulted and murdered as she was walking home in Ilford by Jordan McSweeney. The murder attracted attention after it was discovered McSweeney had committed numerous other offences and should have been recalled to prison.

Murder
Aleena had begun working at the Royal Courts of Justice five weeks before her death.

Around 2am on 26 June, Aleena left a bar on Ilford High Street close to Ilford railway station and began walking up Cranbrook Road towards Valentines Park. At the same time, McSweeney had been thrown out of a bar for harassing staff and had subsequently approached several other women. At 2:17am, Aleena was violently attacked by McSweeney on Cranbrook Road. She was discovered collapsed on a driveway, struggling to breathe, and was taken to the Royal London Hospital where she died of her injuries.

Aftermath
The murder occurred nine days after McSweeney was released from prison on licence, having being jailed for robbery. A subsequent report in The Guardian said an attempt was made to recall him to prison two days before the murder, and suggested he should not have been released in the first place. The Metropolitan Police conducted an internal review after reports were published that McSweeney had been convicted 28 times for 69 earlier offences, including nine separate spells in prison, and ought to have been recalled. McSweeney had also had a history of violence and abuse, and a restraining order was taken out against him in 2021. Concern had been raised on 22 June, four days before the murder, after McSweeney failed to show for two appointments. Two days later, the Metropolitan Police attempted to arrest him, but he was not at the address on their records.

The Chief Inspector of Probation said the failure to assess McSweeney was caused by a lack of probation officers. London was highlighted as particularly problematic, with around half of posts remaining to be filled in some London boroughs.

In December, McSweeney pleaded guilty to the murder and was sentenced to life imprisonment with a minimum 38-year term.

In January 2023, the Prime Minister, Rishi Sunak said the murder was a "terrible crime", and announced the government would take urgent action to review how McSweeney was incorrectly assessed for medium risk.

References

External links
 Probation officers failed and Zara Aleena was murdered. You need to know why, Samira Shackle, The Guardian
 Independent Serious Further Offence review of Jordan McSweeney - HM Inspectorate of Probation, January 2023
 The Big Case - Killed Walking Home - BBC

2022 murders in the United Kingdom
2020s murders in London
June 2022 events in the United Kingdom
Deaths by person in London
Female murder victims